Tanking in sports refers to the practice of intentionally fielding non-competitive teams to take advantage of league rules that benefit losing teams. This is a much more common practice in American sports that utilize closed leagues than in open sports leagues in other nations, which typically penalize poor performers using a promotion and relegation system, in which the worst teams after each season are sent to a lower-tiered league and replaced with that league's best teams. Relegation costs teams revenue and makes it more difficult for them to attract top talent, making tanking unfeasible. Tanking teams are usually seeking higher picks in the next draft, since league rules generally give the highest draft picks to the previous season's worst teams. Teams that decide to start tanking often do so by trading away star players in order to reduce payroll and bring in younger prospects. While the terms tanking and rebuilding are sometimes used interchangeably, there are differences between the two concepts.

Tanking is differentiated from actions taken to achieve a pre-determined result in a specific contest, thus violating the rules of the game and possibly laws, which is more specifically deemed match fixing.

Examples
One of the first teams to tank was the 1983–84 Houston Rockets, who considered the season lost after starting 20–26 and decided to play more bench players to fall in the standings and get higher in the draft order for the following season, and later they would draft Hakeem Olajuwon in the first spot. This proved to be beneficial to the Rockets as Olajuwon later became regarded as one of the greatest basketball centers of all time. In the 1983–84 NHL season, the Pittsburgh Penguins and New Jersey Devils admitted they wanted to lose in order to get the number one pick in the draft and select Mario Lemieux. Tanking did not become prevalent until the 2010s, when teams in all four major American leagues (MLB, NFL, NBA, and NHL) were engaged in various forms of the practice.

The Chicago Cubs and Houston Astros pioneered the practice in MLB in the 2010s, with the Astros taking tanking to a new level (they finished with the worst record in baseball by 6 games or more for 3 consecutive years). Other teams like the Miami Marlins, Baltimore Orioles, Kansas City Royals, and Detroit Tigers have sought to emulate the strategy by trading away their best players, with the twin goals of drafting and developing younger stars and cutting costs in order to become competitive again several years later.

The GM explained how he got the team's owners and the coach to agree to this plan while trying to keep it a secret from the players.

In 2014, the Australian Football League's Melbourne Football Club were fined $500,000 for their involvement in a 2009 tanking scandal.

One of the most notable examples of tanking in the modern era of professional sports is "The Process", a plan by Sam Hinkie, the GM of the NBA's Philadelphia 76ers, to rebuild the team by intentionally tanking in order to gain draft position. In the three seasons from 2013 to 2016, Philadelphia recorded a total of 47 wins, never surpassing 20 in any year. This included an NBA record 27 game losing streak between the end of the 2014–15 and 15–16 seasons. This poor on-court performance led to a three-year struggle within the organization, which culminated in Hinkie leaving the organization in April 2016. However, as the team lost, they collected valuable assets in the form of draft picks. In the five drafts from 2014 to 2018, the 76ers drafted six times in the top 10 and selected cornerstones Joel Embiid and Ben Simmons in two of those drafts. From 2017 to 2022, Philadelphia won more than 40 games in every season and reached the playoffs each year. However, the team has struggled in the playoffs and not advanced past the Conference Semifinals.

When Jon Gruden retook control of the Oakland Raiders prior to the 2018 NFL season he liquidated most of the Raiders' talent, most notably trading five-time Pro Bowler Khalil Mack to the Chicago Bears for two first round draft picks, leading to accusations that he was intentionally tanking the team in hopes of fielding a competitive team when the Raiders moved to Las Vegas in 2020. The Raiders, who had finished 12–4 and qualified for the playoffs two seasons prior, finished the 2018 season with only four wins, but saw significant improvement in 2019 thanks to strong play from the team's rookies.

The Miami Dolphins were accused of tanking during the 2019 NFL season when new head coach Brian Flores oversaw a similar liquidation of the team's established talent. In September, tackle Laremy Tunsil and safety Minkah Fitzpatrick were sent to contending football teams in exchange for future draft picks; both would subsequently be named to the Pro Bowl. After starting the season 0–7, however, the 2019 Dolphins won 5 of their last 9 games. The victories denied Miami the first overall pick of the 2020 NFL Draft, although the team was able to select Alabama quarterback Tua Tagovailoa, whom they were rumored to have been deliberately losing games for. The next season, the 2020 Dolphins went 10–6 and missed the playoffs by one game, while the trade of Tunsil allowed them to obtain the third overall pick of the 2021 NFL Draft. Flores later alleged in a 2022 lawsuit that Dolphins owner Stephen M. Ross offered to pay him $100,000 for each game he lost.

Philadelphia Eagles head coach Doug Pederson faced allegations of deliberately losing the final game of the 2020 NFL season after he replaced starting quarterback Jalen Hurts with backup Nate Sudfeld. When Sudfeld relieved Hurts early in the fourth quarter, the Eagles were facing only a three-point deficit against the Washington Football Team, but Sudfeld committed two consecutive turnovers that helped Washington win 20–14. As a result, the 4–11–1 Eagles moved up from ninth overall to sixth overall in the 2021 NFL Draft, while Washington clinched the NFC East, which would have been clinched by the New York Giants if Philadelphia won. Pederson denied the allegations, stating he intended to give Sudfeld the opportunity to play, although he was fired a week after the game.

Encouragement by fans
As the NFL does not have a draft lottery, coverage of some NFL drafts has been dominated by the presence of a highly touted player who is widely expected to be among the first picked, portraying them as a "sweepstakes" prize for the league's worst team. The 2009 NFL Draft was nicknamed "The Matthew Stafford Sweepstakes" as Georgia quarterback Matthew Stafford was widely expected to be the first player drafted regardless of which team held the first overall pick. Stafford was indeed drafted first overall, by the Detroit Lions, who had gone winless during the previous season. This has led to public campaigns where fans of poor performing teams actively encourage losing in order to improve the team's draft position when such a player is expected to be in the next draft.

The first widely known example of such a campaign was "Suck for Luck" during the 2011 NFL season, in which fans of mediocre teams encouraged losing in hopes of drafting Stanford quarterback Andrew Luck, who was considered one of the NFL's best quarterback prospects. The campaign was widely criticized by sports writers, who noted that it is not in the nature of professional athletes to intentionally lose games and that poor performance should bring punishment, not encouragement. The campaign was denounced by Hall of Fame quarterback Dan Marino when fans of his former team, the Miami Dolphins, began participating in it and Luck himself, who called it "stupid". Nonetheless, a similar "Tank for Tua" campaign emerged in the 2019 NFL season, with fans of poor performing teams encouraging losing in hopes of drafting Alabama quarterback Tua Tagovailoa. However, when Tagovailoa suffered a season ending hip injury that put his chances of declaring for the 2020 NFL Draft in question, the campaign turned to LSU quarterback Joe Burrow and Ohio State defensive end Chase Young, respectively becoming "Bungle for Burrow" and "Choke for Chase".

Since acquiring the first overall selection requires having the worst overall record, fans have responded negatively to teams lowering their draft position by winning games. After the Philadelphia Eagles lost their first 11 games in 1968, fans anticipated them obtaining USC running back O. J. Simpson first overall in the upcoming draft. However, the Eagles won two of their last three games, which resulted in the Buffalo Bills drafting Simpson first overall. During the final game of the season, Eagles fans vented their frustrations with the team by booing and throwing snowballs at a fan dressed as Santa Claus. A similar situation occurred during the 2020 NFL season when New York Jets fans were angered by the team winning their first game in Week 15. Jets fans believed the team would be able to select Clemson quarterback Trevor Lawrence first overall in the 2021 NFL Draft, but the victory gave the first overall selection to the Jacksonville Jaguars. The Jaguars would ultimately clinch the first overall selection the following week, leading to them drafting Lawrence.

Similar draft coverage and reaction by fans has been seen in the National Hockey League. Normally, players selected in the NHL Entry Draft continue to play in minor leagues (often their team's affiliate in the developmental American Hockey League) before they reach the NHL, if they reach the NHL at all. Thus, when a draft contains a NHL-ready player who could make an immediate impact for their team, they are coveted. Examples of this include the 1984 NHL Entry Draft, with multiple teams seeking entry into the lottery for the chance to draft Mario Lemieux, or the 2005 NHL Entry Draft, which was nicknamed the "Sidney Crosby Sweepstakes" as it was believed the winner of that year's lottery would immediately draft Sidney Crosby. The 2015 NHL Entry Draft contained two highly touted prospects, Connor McDavid and Jack Eichel, effectively guaranteeing the last-place team would land an elite player, thus fans of mediocre teams encouraged losing throughout the 2014–15 NHL season. This was most prominently seen among Buffalo Sabres fans, who actively cheered for the opposing team at home games while The Buffalo News regularly published the "McEichel Derby", which tracked the Sabres' ranking among the league's worst teams. First Niagara Center infamously erupted in cheers when Sam Gagner of the Phoenix Coyotes scored an overtime-winning goal in a late season match, as the low-ranked Coyotes were seen as a major "threat" to Buffalo landing a top-two pick. The Sabres finished the season with the worst overall record, securing the second-overall pick which they used to draft Eichel. The NHL revised their draft the following season in response, removing the second pick guarantee for the league's worst team and making all 14 teams who miss the playoffs eligible to win a top-three pick through the draft lottery. Eichel's six years in Buffalo were marred by team underperformance and lack of chemistry (the team failed to make the playoffs in any season with Eichel), and he was traded in late 2021 to the Vegas Golden Knights.

Fans of the Philadelphia 76ers adopted the mantra "Trust the Process" when the team was tanking from 2013 to 2016.

Analytics of tanking
The term 'inverse analytics' was first introduced in 2018. The 2018 NBA draft featured several highly sought-after prospects, including eventual top picks Deandre Ayton, Marvin Bagley III, Luka Dončić, and Trae Young. In order to contend for the rights to these players, NBA teams allegedly began intentionally losing to the point that an NBA executive reportedly told ESPN that "inverse analytics" were being used. The evidence of this comes from the Dallas Mavericks, who used many questionable lineups toward the end of the year. For example, with less than five minutes to go and down by one point against the Lakers, the Mavericks used a lineup that had played together for a total of 12 minutes during the first three and a half months of the season. Mavericks owner Mark Cuban was fined $600,000 for openly commenting on the benefits of tanking.

Disadvantages
While tanking can be a successful strategy in eventually building a winning team, it alienates fans in the midst of the rebuilding process as fans are frustrated by losing teams. During the Astros' rebuilding years of 2011–2013, when they lost an average of 108 games per season, the team's attendance was cut in half, and one game had a television rating of 0.0. The Sabres have also seen dips in attendance since their rebuilding years in the 2010s and have also been described as a "toxic environment".

Tanking can lead to strife with players' unions, as tanking teams choose rookies on inexpensive contracts over free agents wanting multimillion-dollar deals.

Leagues also see tanking as a threat to their existing revenue streams. For example, the NBA sees this as a potentially major issue, since one of the largest drivers of revenue generation for professional leagues is gate receipts. Tanking has been shown to drastically reduce attendance and thus hurt the NBA's bottom line.

Response
The NBA, NHL, and MLB have responded to the phenomenon in recent years by changing their draft from reverse-order to a lottery formula which is only loosely tied to the previous season's standings. Some observers have called for leagues to adopt a European-style promotion and relegation system, where the worst teams are demoted to a minor league, to make tanking less attractive. The NBA has fined executives and owners for referencing the merits of losing.

In response to concerns about tanking, the NBA changed the way teams are allocated draft picks. In 2018, the league leveled the draft lottery odds, giving the worst team a lower chance of getting the number one overall pick. In theory, this change serves to dissuade teams from intentionally losing.

References

Sports terminology
Baseball strategy
Sports science
Basketball terminology
American football terminology
Ice hockey terminology